TR or tr may stand for

Arts and entertainment

Gaming
 Tomb Raider, one of the most successful video game franchises
 Terminal Reality, an American video game developer
 A currency in online game TalesRunner
 Terran Republic, a faction in the video game series PlanetSide

Music
 Korg TR, a variant of the Korg Triton music workstation synthesizer
 Trill, notation for musical ornament
 TR-808, TR-909 etc., 1980s Roland drum machines

Businesses and organizations
 Scoot, IATA code since 2017
 Tiger Airways, IATA code between 2003 and 2017
 Tomahawk Railway, reporting mark
 Transbrasil, IATA airline code until 2001
 Team Rubicon, commonly used abbreviation
 Talyllyn Railway, a Welsh railway
 Thomson Reuters, a Canadian multinational media conglomerate
Texas Roadhouse, restaurant chain in the United States
 Tokyu Railways. See Tokyu Corporation.

Language
 Tr, a digraph
 Turkish language (ISO 639 alpha-1 code "tr")

People
 Theodore Roosevelt, the 26th president of the United States
 Presidency of Theodore Roosevelt, 1901-1909
 The , a Nimitz-class aircraft carrier
 T. Rajendar, Indian filmmaker and politician
 Todd Rundgren, American musician and record producer

Places
 TR postcode area, UK postal code for the Truro area
 Travelers Rest, South Carolina, US
 Turkey (ISO 3166-1 alpha-2 country code TR)

Science, technology, and mathematics

Biology and medicine
 Thyroid hormone receptor, a nuclear receptor
 Tricuspid regurgitation, within the heart
 Repetition time, magnetic resonance imaging
 Taxonomic rank

Computing
 .tr, the country code top level domain (ccTLD) for Turkey
 tr (Unix), command to translate characters
 Table row, an HTML element

Vehicles
 Thai Rung Union Car
 Toronto Rocket, a rolling stock of the Toronto subway 
 Triumph Motor Company. a sports car designation, e.g. TR2
 Ferrari TR (set index), several cars

Other uses in science, technology, finance, and mathematics
 TR-1, a version of the Lockheed U-2 aircraft.
 Technical Report, a type of ISO document.
 Trace (linear algebra).
 Ton of refrigeration.
 Total return.

Other uses 
 Textus Receptus: Printed Greek New Testament translation sources
 Training routines (Scientology)
 Tax return
 Tax refund

See also